Carte Blanche is a South African investigative journalism television series that airs on M-Net during prime time viewing on Sunday nights, currently at 19:00. It was launched in 1988 and has since earned credibility amongst South African viewers for its investigation into corruption, consumer issues and current events. The series also has received numerous awards.

History

Carte Blanche began its broadcast in 1988, anchored by Derek Watts and Ruda Landman. Landman left the show in 2007; the same year Bongani Bingwa became a presenter.

In January 2010, two spinoff series, Carte Blanche Medical and Carte Blanche Consumer, began. Carte Blanche Medical premiered on 18 January 2010 and was anchored by Bongani Bingwa, while Carte Blanche Consumer, premiering on 24 January 2010, was anchored by Devi Sankaree Govender. Both series, which ran for four seasons, were cancelled in 2011. Shortly thereafter, on 24 January 2011, Carte Blanche Extra launched, but was canceled after only airing 10 episodes.

To celebrate 25 years on air on 1 September 2013, Carte Blanche broadcast from the Telkom Joburg Tower in Hillbrow, closed to the public in 1981 during a state of emergency. A book Carte Blanche 25: The Stories Behind the Stories was published, looking at memorable moments behind the scenes of South Africa's longest running current affairs show.

A Carte Blanche channel featuring coverage of the Trial of Oscar Pistorius was launched on DStv on 2 March 2014.

Presenters
 Derek Watts (1988–) 
 Devi Sankaree Govender (2002–2020)
 Claire Mawisa (2015–)
 Macfarlane Moleli (2018–)
 John Webb (2004–)
 Bongani Bingwa (2007–2018)
 Ruda Landman (1988–2007)
 Bonita Nuttall (2007–2015)

Carte Blanche 'Making A Difference' Trust

To celebrate 20 years on air in 2008, Carte Blanche launched the "Making a Difference" Trust to raise funds for specialised paediatric units in selected state hospitals and several welfare organisations across South Africa. The Trust has undertaken major paediatric ward revitalisation and capital building projects around the country – at two sites in Johannesburg, two in Pretoria, one each in Bloemfontein, Kimberly, East London, Sebokeng and Durban. The tenth hospital currently being assisted is Tygerberg Hospital in Cape Town.

Apart from several infrastructural upgrades at two child welfare organisations, the Carte Blanche Making a Difference Trust has in previous years supported feeding schemes and assisted in providing food parcels and managing supplies at Inchanga in KZN and Johannesburg Child Welfare and Johannesburg Parent and Child Counselling Centres in greater Johannesburg and at Hartebeespoort Dam in the North-West province.

Recent awards

See also
 Combined Artists
 DStv
 Multichoice
 M-Net Literary Awards
 List of South African television series

References

External links
 Carte Blanche official website
 Combined Artists official website

1980s South African television series
1988 South African television series debuts
M-Net original programming
South African television news shows